Thomas Domian (born 5 July 1964) is a retired West German competition rower who won a gold medal in the coxed eights event at the 1988 Summer Olympics.

References

1964 births
Living people
Sportspeople from Gelsenkirchen
Olympic rowers of West Germany
Rowers at the 1988 Summer Olympics
Olympic gold medalists for West Germany
Olympic medalists in rowing
West German male rowers
Medalists at the 1988 Summer Olympics